Hancock Field may refer to:

 Hancock Field (California), a former (1927–1959) airport and military airfield located near Santa Maria, California, United States
 Santa Maria Public Airport (Capt. G. Allan Hancock Field), located near Santa Maria, California, United States
 Syracuse Hancock International Airport (named for Clarence E. Hancock), located near Syracuse, New York, United States
 Hancock Field Air National Guard Base, Syracuse, New York
 Hancock Stadium, a multi-purpose stadium at Illinois State University